The Miami Eagles (also known as the Miami Owls and Miami Blues) was a minor league baseball team located in Miami, Oklahoma. The team played in the Kansas–Oklahoma–Missouri League from 1946–1952.

External links
Baseball Reference

Miami, Oklahoma
Defunct minor league baseball teams
Professional baseball teams in Oklahoma
Brooklyn Dodgers minor league affiliates
Philadelphia Phillies minor league affiliates
Baseball teams established in 1946
Baseball teams disestablished in 1952
1946 establishments in Oklahoma
1952 disestablishments in Oklahoma
Defunct baseball teams in Oklahoma